Bagnolo San Vito is a comune (municipality) in the Province of Mantua in the Italian region Lombardy, located about  southeast of Milan and about  southeast of Mantua.

In its territory Etruscan remains have been excavated. The frazione of San Nicolò Po was the birthplace of road cyclist Learco Guerra.

References

External links
 Official website

Cities and towns in Lombardy